S. P. Jayaraman was an Indian politician and former Member of the Legislative Assembly of Tamil Nadu.

Political career 
He was elected to the Tamil Nadu legislative assembly from Vandavasi constituency as a Dravida Munnetra Kazhagam candidate in 2006 election.

Personal life 
He was born in Chengadu village near Cheyyar. He died of cancer on 2 November 2009 in Adyar Cancer Institute after one-year battle with cancer. He was 56 and survived by his wife, four sons and a daughter.

References 

Tamil Nadu MLAs 2006–2011
Dravida Munnetra Kazhagam politicians
2009 deaths
Year of birth missing
India MPs 1962–1967
Lok Sabha members from Tamil Nadu
People from Tiruvannamalai district